"dance4life" is a song recorded by Tiësto featuring vocals by Maxi Jazz of Faithless. As of May 2006, Tiësto is the official worldwide ambassador for the dance4life foundation. dance4life is an initiative originating in the Netherlands designed to increase awareness of HIV and AIDS in secondary school-aged youth.

Kofi Annan, then Secretary General of the United Nations said about the song

The video for the song is a demonstration of the small world phenomenon, which is an important concept in the widespread transmission of HIV and AIDS. The original edit of the video demonstrates a link of 6 people from Tiësto back to himself, however the normally broadcast version of it cuts his first appearance out, as well as removing the mention of the phenomenon.

In 2008 Tiësto mixed a new version of dance4life, it is featured in the Elements of Life World Tour DVD as "dance4life (Freedom Mix)". This new mixed version appears in the promotional video for dance4life.

Formats and track listings
Xbox Live Marketplace

The video is also available for download from the Xbox Live Marketplace.

CD, Maxi Singles

12" Vinyl

Limited Edition

Charts
The song debuted at number 21 in the Netherlands, to peak for 5 consecutive weeks at number 3. It stayed eleven weeks in the top ten.

Weekly charts

Year-end charts

References

2006 singles
Tiësto songs
Songs written by Tiësto